

Events
Folquet de Lunel, Dalfinet, and Cerverí de Girona in the paid service of Peter the Great

Works published
 by Olivier lo Templier, celebrating the Crusade fleet of James the Conqueror, which left Barcelona that year

Births
 Vedanta Desika (died 1370), poet, devotee, philosopher and master-teacher

Deaths

13th-century poetry
Poetry